West Norfolk may refer to:
West Norfolk, England, borough of Norfolk, England
West Norfolk (UK Parliament constituency)
West Norfolk, Virginia, neighborhood of Portsmouth, Virginia